"Love and Pain" is a song by German musician known under the pseudonym of Captain Hollywood Project. It was released in 1996 as the second single from his third album, The Afterparty (1996). Featuring vocals by singer Petra Spiegl, it peaked at number nine in Finland and number 50 in Germany.

Critical reception
Pan-European magazine Music & Media wrote, "While most EHR singles have slowed to mid-tempo for the summer, this track kicks in with a fast dance beat. The melody is classic Euro-dance, but Catania's House And Pain radio remix is pure house."

Music video
The music video for "Love and Pain" was directed by P. Ythall & F. Fernberg and was filmed in California.

Track listing

Charts

References

1996 songs
1996 singles
Captain Hollywood Project songs
English-language German songs